Duhok International Airport (Sorani:فڕۆکەخانەی نێودەوڵەتیی دھۆک Badini: Matara Internasyonala Duhoke Arabic: مطار دهوك الدولي)is an international airport currently under construction in Kurdistan. It is located in the Duhok city province just near the town of Sêmêl. Duhok airport serves the Duhok Governorate of Iraq.

Construction

2012 Opening ceremony 
The Lebanese company Dar al-Handasa had started to build the company in the summer of 2012. At the end of February 2012 the airport facilities would have been completed. Another South Korea company, Incon, had been given the assignment to set up the structure of the airport. This was initially ordered to be done in May 2012 so that the airport could start to operate.

Duhok International Airport (DIA) would be the third international airport in the Kurdistan region of Iraq, the other two being Erbil International Airport and Sulaimaniyah International Airport. The project costs US$450 million and is going to handle approximately one million passengers for the first year upon service.

The project was delayed due to a number of regional crises. As of 2022, it is still under construction.

References

External links

Duhok Airport website Official website of Duhokairport
Duhok Airport website Duhok Airport Facebook page
Duhok Airport website The website of DIA project
Erbil Airport website The website of Hewler International Airport
Slemani Airport website The website of Slemani International Airport
Dar al-Handasa website The website of the Libanese Dar al-Handasa Group

Airports in Iraq
Airports in Kurdistan Region (Iraq)
2012 establishments in Iraqi Kurdistan
Duhok